Konstantopoulos is a Greek surname, with the feminine form being Konstantopoulou. The surname is sometimes transliterated with a leading "C". Notable people include:

Aikaterini Konstantopoulou, the original name of the Greek actress Katina Paxinou (1900-1973)
Dimitrios Konstantopoulos (born 1978), Greek footballer
Elina Konstantopoulou (born 1970), Greek singer
Konstantinos Konstantopoulos (1832–1910), former Prime Minister of Greece
Nikos Konstantopoulos (born 1942), Greek politician
Zoi Konstantopoulou (born 1976), Greek politician and Speaker of Parliament

Greek-language surnames
Surnames
Patronymic surnames